Mohamed Al-Nahdi is an Emirati Olympic middle-distance runner. He represented his country in the men's 1500 meters at the 1996 Summer Olympics. His time was a 3:47.06.

References

1967 births
Living people
Emirati male middle-distance runners
Olympic athletes of the United Arab Emirates
Athletes (track and field) at the 1992 Summer Olympics